Ervin Selita (born 25 September 1992), professionally known as Vinz, is an Albanian rapper and songwriter. He is one half of music group Hellbanianz with fellow Albanian rapper Stealth.

Discography

Singles
As lead artist

As featured artist

References 

  

Albanian rappers
21st-century British rappers
21st-century Albanian rappers
1999 births
Living people